The archaeological site of La Ribera de Algaida or Ribera de Turaniana  is one of the most important human settlements in the history of Almería because of his extension and his long occupation. It has an extension from 20 to 30 ha, and it was occupied since the late Copper Age (from Argaric culture until Roman Era). It was discovered in 1859 and it is located in Aguadulce (Almería).

On 17 September 1991 it was declared Bien de Interés Cultural (BIC) with the category of archaeological site.

References

External links

Bien de Interés Cultural landmarks in the Province of Almería
Archaeological sites in Andalusia
Roman towns and cities in Spain
Prehistoric sites in Spain